Eumenophorus is a genus of Sierra Leonean tarantulas that was first described by Reginald Innes Pocock in 1897.  it contains two species, found in Sierra Leone: E. clementsi and E. murphyorum. It is considered a senior synonym of Monocentropella.

See also
 List of Theraphosidae species

References

Theraphosidae genera
Spiders of Africa
Taxa named by R. I. Pocock
Theraphosidae